Kumaon or Kumaun may refer to:

 Kumaon division, a region in Uttarakhand, India
 Kumaon Kingdom, a former country in Uttarakhand, India
 Kumaon, Iran, a village in Isfahan Province, Iran
 , a ship of the Royal Indian Navy during WWII

See also
 Kumaon Engineering College, former name of Bipin Tripathi Kumaon Institute of Technology in Uttarakhand, India
 Kumaon University, in Nainital, Uttarakhand, India
 Kumaon Regiment, a regiment of the Indian Army
 Kumaon Mastiff, a breed of dog
 Kumaoni (disambiguation)